Jiaohe is a middle-sized county-level city in east-central Jilin province, People's Republic of China, bordering Heilongjiang to the northeast. It is under the administration of Jilin City,  to the west, and it is well known for its production of tobacco. The mayor of the city is Wang Gang.

The sister city (or twin town) of Jiaohe is Folsom, California, United States.

Administrative divisions
The city administers 7 subdistricts, 8 towns, 1 township, and 1 ethnic township.

Geography
The city borders the county-level city of Dunhua to the east, Huadian to the south, and Fengman District to the west. The Songhua River and the Mudan River both run through the city.

Climate
Jiaohe has a four-season, monsoon-influenced, humid continental climate (Köppen Dwa/Dwb). Spring and autumn are somewhat short transitional periods, with some precipitation, but are usually dry and windy. Summers are very warm and humid, with a prevailing southeasterly wind due to the East Asian monsoon; July averages . Snow is usually light during the winter, and annual rainfall is heavily concentrated from June to August.

Economy 
The city's main agricultural products include rice, maize, and beans.

Mineral deposits in Jiaohe include coal, copper, iron, nickel, granite, kyanite, diatomite, peat, and dolomite.

Transport 
The , and the Lafa–Harbin railway both run through the city.

The city's main thoroughfares include National Highway 302 and Jilin Provincial Highway 204.

See also
Jiaohe Ruins

References

External links
 Jiaohe City Government website

 
Cities in Jilin
County-level divisions of Jilin
Jilin City